Mount Manning is a mountain located in New South Wales, Australia.

References

Mountains of New South Wales
Central Coast (New South Wales)